An Qiyuan (born July 1933) is a Chinese politician who served as the Communist Party Secretary of Shaanxi Province from December 1994 to August 1997.

Biography
An Qiyuan, of Han ethnicity, was born in 1933 in Lintong, Shaanxi province. He joined the CPC in 1953, and graduated from the Geology Department of Northwest University in 1956. He spent the formative years of his career in the mining industry. He headed the Petroleum Exploration Bureau of Heilongjiang Province, Songliao, and successively served as the Director of the Daqing Oil Mine, the chief of the 1st Oil Extracting Headquarters, Underground Operation Section in Daqing, the director of the Petroleum Geophysical Prospecting Bureau in the Ministry of Petroleum Industry, the Deputy Director of the China Seismological Bureau, and the Director of the China Seismological Bureau.

1988 marked his first foray into politics, when he was appointed as a member to the Provincial Party Standing Committee for Shaanxi Province. He was the party chief of the provincial capital Xi'an, the Secretary of the Political and Legal Affairs Committee of Shaanxi Province.

In 1993, An attended  the 14th CPC National Congress in Beijing as a delegate. In December 1994, he became the provincial Party Secretary, or party chief, of Shaanxi. He held this position until August 1997. After this, he was a delegate to the 15th CPC National Congress in Beijing. In 1998, An became Chairman of the Shaanxi Provincial Committee of the Chinese People's Political Consultative Conference. While this position was considered a largely ceremonial role, An used his experience and clout to influence high-level politicians to put forth a comprehensive plan to prevent flooding on the Wei River. He also advocated for a series of other causes, including mentally challenged children, rural incomes, national oil strategy, and urban poverty. He left public life in 2008.

An was a member of the Standing Committee of the 14th Central Commission for Discipline Inspection.

External links
(An Qiyuan Profile)

Chinese Communist Party politicians from Shaanxi
Living people
1933 births
Political office-holders in Shaanxi
People's Republic of China politicians from Shaanxi
Politicians from Xi'an
Deputy Communist Party secretaries of Shaanxi